Karum may refer to:

Karum (trade post), ancient Assyrian trade posts in Anatolia from 20th to 18th centuries BC
Lake Karum, lake in the Afar Region of Ethiopia